Association Sportive Komorozine de Domoni is a Comorian football club located in Domoni, Comoros.  It currently plays in Comoros Premier League.

In 2013 the team has won Comoros Premier League.

Honours
Comoros Premier League: 1
2013

Performance in CAF competitions
CAF Champions League: 1 appearance
2014 – Preliminary round

Stadium
Currently the team plays at the Stade Oumoini.

References

External links
Team profile - soccerway.com

Football clubs in the Comoros
Association football clubs established in 1974